T. Malaravan is an Indian politician and former member of the Tamil Nadu Legislative Assembly from the Coimbatore North constituency in 2011 elections. As a cadre of Anna Dravida Munnetra Kazhagam party, he represented the Coimbatore West constituency in 2006 elections.

He was the former Mayor of Coimbatore from 2001 to 2006.

References 

Mayors of Coimbatore
Members of the Tamil Nadu Legislative Assembly
All India Anna Dravida Munnetra Kazhagam politicians
Living people
Year of birth missing (living people)